Dragus may refer to
 Drăguș, a commune in Romania
Drăguș River in Romania
Maria-Victoria Dragus (born 1994), German-Romanian actress
Mihai Drăguș (born 1973), Romanian football player

See also
Dragu (disambiguation)